Oskar Danon (7 February 1913 – 18 December 2009) was a Yugoslav composer and conductor.

Biography
Danon, a Bosnian Jew, was born in 1913 in Sarajevo, then in the Austro-Hungarian Empire (modern Bosnia and Herzegovina). He studied music in the Kingdom of Yugoslavia and Prague, Czechoslovakia, where he obtained his Ph.D. in musicology.

He worked as a conductor in Sarajevo, and after World War II became conductor and director of the Belgrade Opera (1944–1965) and the chief conductor of the Slovenian Philharmonic Orchestra (1970–1974). He was also a conductor of the Belgrade Philharmonic Orchestra. With these orchestras he performed both in Yugoslavia and abroad (Paris, Wiesbaden, Florence, etc.).

In 1955, as part of a Russian complete opera recording project with Decca and the Belgrade National Opera, he conducted Prince Igor, Eugene Onegin and A Life for the Tsar in the Dome of Culture.

With the Royal Philharmonic Orchestra in London he recorded works by Smetana, Enescu, Dvořák, Rimsky-Korsakov, Prokofiev, Stravinsky and Saint-Saëns for Reader's Digest in 1962-63, and in 1963 Die Fledermaus in German and English for RCA in Vienna with Adele Leigh, Anneliese Rothenberger, Risë Stevens, Sándor Kónya, Eberhard Waechter and George London, as well as recording for Supraphon in Czechoslovakia: Scheherazade, Orpheus, Pulcinella and the Franck symphony.

His Vienna State Opera debut in 1964 was The Gambler, in a production from Belgrade, followed over the years by Don Quichotte (Massenet), The Miraculous Mandarin (Bartók), Tannhäuser with Gottlob Frick, Wolfgang Windgassen, Eberhard Waechter, Christa Ludwig and Gundula Janowitz, Carmen, La traviata, Aida, The Flying Dutchman, Rigoletto, Madama Butterfly and Otello. For the Verdi Theatre in Trieste he conducted Boris Godunov, The Golden Cockerel and Countess Maritza.

Oskar Danon was professor at the Belgrade Music Academy. He was awarded the October Award of the City of Belgrade for his conducting activity, as well as the AVNOJ Award (1970). Danon was also a member and former president of the Association of Musical Artists of Serbia.

He died in Belgrade (Serbia) on 18 December 2009, aged 96. He is interred in the Alley of Distinguished Citizens in the Belgrade New Cemetery.

See also
 Uz Maršala Tita

References

Sources 
Holmes, John L. Conductors on Record, Victor Gollancz, London 1982.
Kolar, Vladimir. Oskar Danon. Tonovi jednog vremena, Savez kompozitorajugoslavije, Beograd 1973.
Krleza, Miroslav. Leksikon Jugoslavenske Muzike, Jugoslavenski Leksikografski Zavod, Zagreb 1984.
Maksimović, M. (1971): Beogradska filharmonija 1951–1971, Beogradska filharmonija, Beograd
Mala enciklopedija Prosveta, I (1978), Prosveta, Beograd
Muzička enciklopedija, I (1971), Jugoslovenski leksikografski zavod, Zagreb
Muzika i muzičari u NOB — Zbornik sećanja (1982), Grupa izdavača, Beograd
Pedeset godina Fakulteta muzičke umetnosti (Muzičke akademije) 1937–1987  (1988), Univerzitet umetnosti u Beogradu, Beograd
Pejović, R. (1986): Oskar Danon, Univerzitet umetnosti u Beogradu, Beograd
Peričić, V. [1969]: Muzički stvaraoci u Srbiji, Prosveta, Beograd
Sadie, Stanley. The New Grove Dictionary of Music and Musicians, Macmillan, London 1980.
Danon Oskar i Hribar Svjetlana "Ritmovi nemira",I. izdanje Sarajevska zima,Sarajevo 2005., II. izdanje Beogradska filharmonija, Beograd 2006. godine

1913 births
2009 deaths
Musicians from Sarajevo
Bosnia and Herzegovina Sephardi Jews
Serbian composers
Serbian Sephardi Jews
Yugoslav composers
Yugoslav Jews
Academic staff of the University of Arts in Belgrade
20th-century classical composers
Male classical composers
Members of the Academy of Sciences and Arts of Bosnia and Herzegovina
Burials at Belgrade New Cemetery
20th-century male musicians